The Gift is a Philippine drama series to be broadcast by TV5 starring Ogie Alcasid and Ara Mina. It is set to premiere on October 14, 2013 on the network's primetime block. However, Ogie Alcasid says that show will be delayed on October 14, 2013 and nothing plans to airing date because TV5 decided to shelve it. Ogie Alcasid says (on PEP) "Ogie Alcasid on the decision of TV5 management to postpone airing of The Gift, his first teleserye in his new home studio: "Meron din akong hunch na dahil siguro nagustuhan nila yung si Sharon [Cuneta] na medyo comedy [sa Madam Chairman]. Baka gusto nila ganun. Kasi very dramatic yung first two weeks [ng The Gift] na ginawa namin, as in, ang bigat. I'm just… hinuhulaan ko lang kung ano yung effect. I think gusto nila masaya lang since Happy Network nga ang TV5."

Cast
Ogie Alcasid as Nathan
Ara Mina as Theresa
Arci Muñoz as Ella
Joshen Bernardo as Eli
Candy Pangilinan as Dorina
Leo Martinez as Manong Aselo

Special participation of Malak So as Elay

References

Philippine drama television series
Unaired television shows